
Gmina Szczytna is an urban-rural gmina (administrative district) in Kłodzko County, Lower Silesian Voivodeship, in south-western Poland.

Neighbouring gminas
Gmina Szczytna is bordered by the towns of Duszniki-Zdrój and Kudowa-Zdrój, and the gminas of Bystrzyca Kłodzka, Kłodzko, Lewin Kłodzki and Radków. It also borders the Czech Republic.

Villages
Apart from the town of Szczytna, the gmina contains the villages of Chocieszów, Dolina, Łężyce, Niwa, Słoszów, Studzienno, Wolany and Złotno.

Twin towns – sister cities

Gmina Szczytna is twinned with:
 Międzychód, Poland
 Náměšť na Hané, Czech Republic
 Tegernheim, Germany
 Velké Poříčí, Czech Republic

References

Szczytna
Kłodzko County